Kurthia populi is a bacterium from the genus of Kurthia.

References

Bacillota
Bacteria described in 2013